The Ukureyskaya Formation, also referred to as the Ukurey Formation is a geological formation in Zabaykalsky Krai, part of the Russian Far East. It is made up of Middle Jurassic and Late Jurassic layers. It covers large areas around Kulinda. The formation is where the type specimen fossils of Kulindadromeus zabaikalicus were found, alongside a single tooth from a medium-sized theropod of unknown affiliations and other indeterminate ornithschians. Recent dating work suggest that the layers containing Kulindadromeus are Bathonian in age.

References 

Geologic formations of Russia
Geology of Siberia
Jurassic System of Asia
Jurassic Russia
Tithonian Stage
Kimmeridgian Stage
Oxfordian Stage
Callovian Stage
Bathonian Stage
Bajocian Stage
Sandstone formations
Siltstone formations
Tuff formations
Paleontology in Russia